The Whistler is a 30-minute U.S. television anthology mystery series, based on the radio series of the same name. 

Produced by Lindsley Parsons and CBS Films, 39 episodes were syndicated beginning in 1954, with Signal Oil and Lipton Tea as sponsors. William Forman was both narrator and the voice of "The Whistler", and Dorothy Roberts whistled the theme. The "Backfire" episode starred Lon Chaney Jr. Notable guest stars included Maureen O'Sullivan, Miriam Hopkins, Patric Knowles, Howard Duff, and John Ireland.

Partial list of episodes

References

External links

The Whistler (TV Series) at CVTA with episode list

1950s American anthology television series
1954 American television series debuts
1955 American television series endings
1950s American crime television series
1950s American mystery television series
CBS original programming
Television series based on radio series
First-run syndicated television programs in the United States